Super Sábados (Super Saturdays) was a TV game and variety show of Telemundo Puerto Rico, which aired from 1984 to 1991. From 1987 to 1989, was also broadcast by Telemundo Network in the United States. In many cities, it competed with the Univision game show "Sabado Gigante".

The program was created by the Argentine producers Oscar and Carlos Sacco, who were father and son. This show was five hours and was on every Saturday night. It hold first place in ratings for many years. It had many hosts through the years like, Johanna Rosaly, Luis Antonio Cosme, Dagmar Rivera, Rosita Velazquez, Eddie Miró, Rolando Barral and sometimes Otilio Warrington also known as Bizcocho.

References

Telemundo original programming
1980s American television series
1990s American television series
1990s Puerto Rican television series
1980s Puerto Rican television series